134340 may refer to:

Pluto, a dwarf planet in the Solar System
"134340", a 2018 BTS (방탄소년단) song of album "Love Yourself:Tear"